A living building material (LBM) is a material used in construction or industrial design that behaves in a way resembling a living organism. Examples include: self-mending biocement, self-replicating concrete replacement, and mycelium-based composites for construction and packaging. Artistic projects include building components and household items.

History 
The development of living building materials began with research of methods for mineralizing concrete, that were inspired by coral mineralization. The use of microbiologically induced calcite precipitation (MICP) in concrete was pioneered by Adolphe et al. in 1990, as a method of applying a protective coating to building façades.

In 2007, "Greensulate", a mycelium-based building insulation material was introduced by Ecovative Design, a spin off of research conducted at the Rensselaer Polytechnic Institute. Mycelium composites were later developed for packaging, sound absorption, and structural building materials such as bricks.

In the United Kingdom, the Materials for Life (M4L) project was founded at Cardiff University in 2013 to "create a built environment and infrastructure which is a sustainable and resilient system comprising materials and structures that continually monitor, regulate, adapt and repair themselves without the need for external intervention." M4L led to the UK's first self-healing concrete trials. In 2017 the project expanded into a consortium led by the universities of Cardiff, Cambridge, Bath and Bradford, changing its name to Resilient Materials 4 Life (RM4L) and receiving funding from the Engineering and Physical Sciences Research Council. This consortium focuses on four aspects of material engineering: self-healing of cracks at multiple scales; self-healing of time-dependent and cycling loading damage; self-diagnosis and healing of chemical damage; and self-diagnosis and immunization against physical damage.

In 2016 the United States Department of Defense's Defense Advanced Research Projects Agency (DARPA) launched the Engineered Living Materials (ELM) program. The goal of this program is to "develop design tools and methods that enable the engineering of structural features into cellular systems that function as living materials, thereby opening up a new design space for building technology... [and] to validate these new methods through the production of living materials that can reproduce, self-organize, and self-heal." In 2017 the ELM program contracted Ecovative Design to produce "a living hybrid composite building material... [to] genetically re-program that living material with responsive functionality [such as] wound repair... [and to] rapidly reuse and redeploy [the] material into new shapes, forms, and applications." In 2020 a research group at the University of Colorado, funded by an ELM grant, published a paper after successfully creating exponentially regenerating concrete.

Self-replicating concrete 

Self-replicating concrete is produced using a mixture of sand and hydrogel, which are used as a growth medium for synechococcus bacteria to grow on.

Synthesis and fabrication 
The sand-hydrogel mixture from which self-replicating concrete is made has a lower pH, lower ionic strength, and lower curing temperatures than a typical concrete mix, allowing it to serve as a growth medium for the bacteria. As the bacteria reproduce they spread through the medium, and biomineralize it with calcium carbonate, which is the main contributor to the overall strength and durability of the material. After mineralization the sand-hydrogel compound is strong enough to be used in construction, as concrete or mortar.

The bacteria in self-replicating concrete react to humidity changes: they are most active - and reproduce the fastest - in an environment with 100% humidity, though a drop to 50% does not have a large impact on the cellular activity. Lower humidity does result in a stronger material than high humidity.

As the bacteria reproduce, their biomineralization activity increases; this allows production capacity to scale exponentially.

Properties 
The structural properties of this material are similar to those of Portland cement-based mortars: it has an elastic modulus of 293.9 MPa, and a tensile strength of 3.6 MPa (the minimum required value for Portland-cement based concrete is approximately 3.5 MPa); however it has a fracture energy of 170 N, which is much less than most standard concrete formulations, which can reach up to several kN.

Uses 
Self-replicating concrete can be used in a variety of applications and environments, but the effect of humidity on the properties of the end material (see above) means that the application of the material must be tailored to its environment. In humid environments the material can be used as to fill cracks in roads, walls and sidewalks, sipping into cavities and growing into a solid mass as it sets; while in drier environments it can be used structurally, due to its increased strength in low-humidity environments.

Unlike traditional concrete, the production of which releases massive amounts of carbon dioxide to the atmosphere, the bacteria used in self-replicating concrete absorb carbon dioxide, resulting in a lower carbon footprint.

This self-replicating concrete is not meant to replace standard concrete, but to create a new class of materials, with a mixture of strength, ecological benefits, and biological functionality.

Calcium carbonate biocement 

Biocement is a sand aggregate material produced through the process of microbiologically induced calcite precipitation (MICP). It is an environmentally friendly material which can be produced using a variety of stocks, from agricultural waste to mine tailings.

Synthesis and fabrication 
Microscopic organisms are the key component in the formation of bioconcrete, as they provide the nucleation site for CaCO to precipitate on the surface. Microorganisms such as Sporosarcina pasteurii are useful in this process, as they create highly alkaline environments where dissolved inorganic carbon (DIC) is present at high amounts. These factors are essential for microbiologically induced calcite precipitation (MICP), which is the main mechanism in which bioconcrete is formed. Other organisms that can be used to induce this process include photosynthesizing microorganisms such as microalgae, cyanobacteria, and sulphate reducing bacteria (SRB) such as Desulfovibrio desulfuricans.

Calcium carbonate nucleation depends on four major factors:
 Calcium concentration
 DIC concentration
 pH levels
 Availability of nucleation sites
As long as calcium ion concentrations are high enough, microorganisms can create such an environment through processes such as ureolysis.

Advancements in optimizing methods to use microorganisms to facilitate carbonate precipitation are rapidly developing.

Properties 
Biocement is able to "self-heal" due to bacteria, calcium lactate, nitrogen, and phosphorus components that are mixed into the material. These components have the ability to remain active in biocement for up to 200 years. Biocement like any other concrete can crack due to external forces and stresses. Unlike normal concrete however, the microorganisms in biocement can germinate when introduced to water. Rain can supply this water which is an environment that biocement would find itself in. Once introduced to water, the bacteria will activate and feed on the calcium lactate that was part of the mixture. This feeding process also consumes oxygen which converts the originally water soluble calcium lactate into insoluble limestone. This limestone then solidifies on surface it is lying on, which in this case is the cracked area, thereby sealing the crack up.

Oxygen is one of the main elements that cause corrosion in materials such as metals. When biocement is used in steel reinforced concrete structures, the microorganisms consume the oxygen thereby increasing corrosion resistance. This property also allows for water resistance as it actually induces healing, and reducing overall corrosion. Water concrete aggregates are what are used to prevent corrosion and these also have the ability to be recycled. There are different methods to form these such as through crushing or grinding of the biocement.

The permeability of biocement is also higher compared to normal cement. This is due to the higher porosity of biocement. Higher porosity can lead to larger crack propagation when exposed to strong enough forces. Biocement is now roughly 20% composed of a self healing agent. This decreases its mechanical strength. The mechanical strength of bioconcrete is about 25% weaker than normal concrete, making its compressive strength lower. Organisms such as Pesudomonas aeruginosa  are effective in creating biocement. These are unsafe to be near humans so these must be avoided.

Uses 
Biocement is currently used in applications such as in sidewalks and pavements in buildings. There are ideas of biological building constructions as well. The uses of biocement are still not widespread because there is currently not a feasible method of mass producing biocement to such a high extent. There is also much more definitive testing that needs to be done to confidently use biocement in such large scale applications where mechanical strength can not be compromised. The cost of biocement is also twice as much as normal concrete. Different uses in smaller applications however include spray bars, hoses, drop lines, and bee nesting. Biocement is still in its developmental stages however its potential proves promising for its future uses.

Mycelium composites 

Mycelium composites are materials that are based on mycelium – the mass of branching, thread-like hyphae produced by fungi. There are several ways to synthesize and fabricate mycelium composites, lending to different properties and use cases of the finish product. Mycelium composites are economical and  sustainable.

Synthesis and fabrication 
Mycelium-based composites are usually synthesized by using different kinds of fungus, especially mushroom. An individual microbe of fungi is introduced to different types of organic substances to form a composite. The selection of fungal species is important for creating a product with specific properties. Some of the fungal species that are used to make composites are G. lucidum, Ganoderma sp. P. ostretus, Pleurotus sp., T. versicolor, Trametes sp., etc. A dense network is formed when the mycelium of the microbe of fungi degrades and colonizes the organic substance. Plant waste is a common organic substrate that is used in mycelium based composites. Fungal mycelium is incubated with a plants waste product to produce sustainable alternatives mostly for petroleum based materials. The mycelium and organic substrate needed to incubate properly and this time is crucial as it is the period that these particles interact together and bind into one to form a dense network and hence form a composite. During this incubation period, mycelium uses the essential nutrients such as carbon, minerals, and water from the waste plant product. Some of the organic substrate components include cotton, wheat grain, rice husk, sorghum fiber, agricultural waste, sawdust, bread particles, banana peel, coffee residue, etc.  The composites are synthesized and fabricated using different techniques such as adding carbohydrates, altering fermentation conditions, using different fabrication technology, altering post-processing stages, and modifying genetics or biochemicals to form products with certain properties. Fabrication of most of the mycelium composites are by using plastic molds, so the mycelium can be grown directly into the desired shape.  Other fabrication methods include laminate skin mold, vacuum skin mold, glass mold, plywood mold, wooden mold, petri dish mold, tile mold, etc. During fabrication process, it is essential to have sterilized environment, a controlled environment condition of light, temperature (25-35°C) and humidity around 60-65% for the best results. One way to synthesize a mycelium based composite is by mixing different composition ratio of fibers, water and mycelium together and putting in a PVC molds in layers while compressing each layer and letting it incubate for couple of days. Mycelium based composites can be processed in foam, laminate and mycelium sheet by using processing techniques such as laster cutting, cold and heat compression, etc. Mycelium composites tend to absorb water when they are newly fabricated, therefore this property can be changed by oven drying the product.

Properties 
One of the advantages about using mycelium based composites is that properties can be altered depending on fabrication process and the use of different fungus. Properties depend on type of fungus used and where they are grown. Additionally, fungi has an ability to degrade the cellulose component of the plant to make composites in a preferable manner. Some important mechanical properties such as compressive strength, morphology, tensile strength, hydrophobicity, and flexural strength can be modified as well for different use of the composite. To increase the tensile strength, the composite can go through heat pressing. The properties of a mycelium composite are affected  by its substrate; for example, a mycelium composite made out of 75 wt% rice hulls has a density of 193 kg/m3, while 75 wt% wheat grains has 359 kg/m3. Another method to increase the density of the composite would be by deleting a hydrophobin gene. These composites also have the ability of self-fusion which increases their strength. Mycelium based composites are usually compact, porous, lightweight and a good insulator. The main property of these composites is that they are entirely natural, therefore sustainable. Another advantage of mycelium based composites is that this substance acts as an insulator, is fireproof, nontoxic, water-resistant, rapidly growing, and able to bond with neighboring mycelium products. Mycelium-based foams (MBFs) and sandwich components are two common types of composite. MBFs are the most efficient type because of their low density property, high quality, and sustainability. The density of MBFs can be decreased by using substrates that are smaller than 2 mm in diameter. These composites have higher thermal conductivity as well.

Uses 
One of the most common use of mycelium based composites is for the alternatives for petroleum and polystyrene based materials. These synthetic foams are usually used for sustainable design and architecture products. The use of mycelium based composites are based on their properties. There are several bio-sustainable companies such as Ecovative Design LLC, MycoWorks, MyCoPlast, etc. that use mycelium based composites that make protective packaging for electronics and food, bricks, leather substitutes, alternatives for floors and acoustic tiles, thermal and acoustic insulation, construction panels, etc. The property of being able to bond with neighboring composite helps the mycelium based composite to form strong bonds for a brick which are widely used. An example is Hy-Fi, a 40-foot-tall tower in MoMA PS1 in New York City, made using 1,000 bricks made from corn stalks and mycelium. This product won the annual Young Architects Program (YAP) contest in 2014. There are also other several commonly used products such as lamps, kitchen utensils, ceiling panels, decorative items, fashion items, chair, etc made out of mycelium. In architecture, mycelium based composites are widely used because they have better insulation performance and fire resistance than currently used products. Mycelium is being used more in industry to replace common plastic materials that are harming the environment. These products are manufactured using low energy, natural manufacturing process and are biodegradable.

Further applications 
Beyond the use of living building materials, the application of microbially induced calcium carbonate precipitation (MICP) has the possibility of helping remove pollutants from wastewater, soil, and the air. Currently, heavy metals and radionuclei  provide a challenge to remove from water sources and soil. Radionuclei in ground water do not respond to traditional methods of pumping and treating the water, and for heavy metals contaminating soil, the methods of removal include phytoremediation and chemical leaching do work; however, these treatments are expensive, lack longevity in effectiveness, and can destroy the productivity of the soil for future uses. By using ureolytic bacteria that is capable of CaCO3 precipitation, the pollutants can move into the calcite structure, thereby removing them from the soil or water. This works through substitution of calcium ions for pollutants that then form solid particles and can be removed. It's reported that 95% of these solid particles can be removed by using ureolytic bacteria. However, when calcium scaling in pipelines occurs, MICP cannot be used as it is calcium-based. Instead of calcium, it is possible to add a low concentration of urea to remove up to 90% of the calcium ions.

Another further application involves a self-constructed foundation that forms in response to pressure through the use of engineering bacteria. The engineered bacteria could be used to detect increased pressure in soil, and then cement the soil particles in place, effectively solidifying the soil. Within soil, pore pressure consists of two factors: the amount of applied stress, and how quickly water in the soil is able to drain. Through analyzing the biological behavior of the bacteria in response to a load and the mechanical behavior of the soil, a computational model can be created. With this model, certain genes within the bacteria can be identified and modified to respond a certain way to a certain pressure. However, the bacteria analyzed in this study was grown in a highly-controlled lab, so real soil environments may not be as ideal. This is a limitation of the model and study it originated from, but it still remains a possible application of living building materials.

References 

Construction